The 1945 Boston Braves season was the 75th season of the franchise.

Tommy Holmes had a career year, with 28 home runs, 117 RBI, and a .352 batting average. He led his team in every offensive category except walks. Holmes led the National League in hits (224), doubles (47), home runs (28), total bases (367), slugging percentage (.577) and on-base plus slugging (.997). He finished second in the NL in RBI and batting average. Holmes also put up a 37-game hitting streak this season, lasting from June 6 to July 8, recording a .423 batting average (66-for-156) with 9 home runs and 41 RBI. His hitting-streak record held for 33 years until 1978, when Pete Rose put together a 44-game hitting streak.

Regular season

Season standings

Record vs. opponents

Roster

Player stats

Batting

Starters by position 
Note: Pos = Position; G = Games played; AB = At bats; H = Hits; Avg. = Batting average; HR = Home runs; RBI = Runs batted in

Other batters 
Note: G = Games played; AB = At bats; H = Hits; Avg. = Batting average; HR = Home runs; RBI = Runs batted in

Pitching

Starting pitchers 
Note: G = Games pitched; IP = Innings pitched; W = Wins; L = Losses; ERA = Earned run average; SO = Strikeouts

Other pitchers 
Note: G = Games pitched; IP = Innings pitched; W = Wins; L = Losses; ERA = Earned run average; SO = Strikeouts

Relief pitchers 
Note: G = Games pitched; W = Wins; L = Losses; SV = Saves; ERA = Earned run average; SO = Strikeouts

Farm system

Notes

References 
1945 Boston Braves season at Baseball Reference

Boston Braves seasons
Boston Braves
Boston Braves
1940s in Boston